Global StarCraft II League (GSL) is a StarCraft II: Legacy of the Void tournament hosted by afreecaTV and Blizzard Entertainment in South Korea. This event is broadcast up to 2 nights a week.  GOMeXp (formerly GOMTV) had hosted it until the last season of 2015. There is also an English language stream available. The tournament features two leagues, Code S (major) and Code A (minor).  The English cast of them is mainly performed by Dan "Artosis" Stemkoski and Nicolas "Tasteless" Plott. Formerly broadcast on Wednesdays and Saturdays on TwitchTV, the program switched to broadcasting on Mondays and Thursdays, with the English casts on YouTube, in 2020.  In 2023, it was reported that the GSL will continue, but with a reduced presence: it will hold fewer, smaller tournaments with the preliminary matches played online, presumably due to Blizzard no longer funding the prize pools.

As of the end of 2015 GSL Season 2, GOMTV has given away over 3.6 billion Korean won (over $3.1 million USD) from the individual GSL and Arena of Legends leagues in StarCraft II.

Main Events

2010 Open Seasons 
The 2010 Open Seasons were the first tournaments for the GSL, featuring three initial events with an overall prize pool of 600 million Korean Won (approximately US$500,000) and a prize of 100 million Won for the winner. These attracted worldwide attention as they featured the largest prize pool in the history of e-Sports. The purpose of the Open Seasons was to sort the players into Code S and Code A for the 2011 season.

Sponsorship League 
Sponsorship League is the regular tournament that is held multiple times a year. Code S is the major league and consists of 32 top players in Korea. Winner of Code S is crowned GSL champion. Code A is the minor league of 32 players. Winner of code A qualifies to Code S. Top seven Code A players and bottom eight Code S players participate in Up & Down Matches in groups of five players. Top two of every group qualify to Code S. Code A qualifiers are held before the start of a new season. Only top ranking players (called Code B) in Korean Battle.net server are allowed to participate. Foreign players are allowed to attend qualifiers without meeting the criteria though.

For the 2011 GSL November season, it was announced that the format would be changing to deal with certain issues that have come up in Code S and Code A. A chart was later released that would illustrate the new format. The new format would be a dual tournament format with double-elimination four-player groups, where players in Code S immediately drop to Code A, and would have to continue playing if they want to get back up to Code S. The new GSL format means that there would no longer be a Code A champion.

The 2012 tour had the tournament format changed slightly, resulting in a longer season with slight changes with prize money in Code A. Due to the extended season, there will only be 5 GSL tournaments in the year.

World Championship Series 2013 

In 2013, the GSL and the OnGameNet Starleague (OSL) shared the duty as the Korean league for Blizzard Entertainment's World Championship Series (WCS) under the name "WCS Korea".

World Championship Series 2014 

With OnGameNet having stopped its StarCraft II activities, GSL became the only individual league in South Korea and ran every season of WCS Korea under its own name again (GSL).

World Championship Series 2015 

In 2015, the GSL and SPOTV's newly established StarCraft II StarLeague (SSL) ran parallel to each other as the focus of professional play in South Korea. Each league had three seasons throughout the year, for a total of six individual league seasons.

World Championship Series 2016 

The GSL and the SSL continued to run as parallel leagues in South Korea for 2016. Each league had two seasons throughout the year, for a total of four individual league seasons, with the finalists of their first and second seasons playing in the first and second season Cross-Finals events.

The first season of GSL for WCS 2016 was preceded by two GSL Pre-Season tournaments which both granted seeding into the main competition to their respective winners.

World Championship 
The World Championship was a yearly tournament that invites top eight non-Korean players to South Korea to play against the top eight Korean players. This is a two-part tournament; the first being a Korea versus the World team tournament, the second being a 16-man single-elimination tournament.

The 2012 tour will not have a World Championship event.

Super Tournament 
Similar to the 2010 Open Seasons, the Super Tournaments are a 64-man tournament featuring a prize pool of 202 million Korean Won. Participants are determined by the total GSL points obtained throughout the year.

The 2012 tour will not have a Super Tournament event.

Blizzard Cup 
The top 10 players of the year will compete in a tournament to decide the best player of the year in a two-phase event including a group stage and a playoff stage. The 2011 event featured the top 5 players in terms of GSL ranking and champions of other events such as MLG, BlizzCon and World Cyber Games 2011.

Casters
The English-language broadcast was performed for years by Dan "Artosis" Stemkoski and Nick "Tasteless" Plott, a combination known as "Tastosis."  The pair were considered a major draw of the tournament and helped establish a new standard in esports commentary in the English-language market, with the pair praised as "fan favorites" and their work praised as iconic to the medium.  Artosis departed from Korea to move to Canada in 2022, with his last cast being of the 2022 GSL S3 Final in October 2022.

Special Events

Arena of Legends 
The Arena of Legends is a special tournament series that is only available to premium users. They are generally online tournaments as opposed to the offline ones of the standard GSL. The first one featured four invited representatives of each race that was broadcast throughout the month of September 2011 on Saturdays and Sundays. Another Arena of Legends tournament was announced on November 2, 2011, called the Team Ace Invitational featuring two players from each team battling it out to see who is the strongest ace. The third Arena of Legends tournament was announced on December 27, 2011, called "Arena of Legends: King of Kong", featuring all of the non-champion runner-up players from previous GSL tournaments. A "Kong" is Korean for a pea, and refers to Hong Jin-Ho, a Brood War legend who was famous for getting second place.

Champions

Code S and other Major Tournaments
This is a list of all major GSL tournaments. They are considered equal by AfreecaTV and the winner of any of these tournaments is called a GSL champion.

2011 GSL October took place in Anaheim, California during BlizzCon. This was the first GSL final to take place outside South Korea.
2012 Hot6ix GSL Season 5 took place at IPL 5 in Las Vegas, Nevada.

Pre-Season Tournaments
Preceding the beginning of 2016 HOT6 Global StarCraft II League Season 1, two Pre-Season tournaments were held by AfreecaTV, with the winner of each being seeded into the main event.

Code A
There will be no more Code A champions due to the format change in 2011 GSL November.

Special Tournaments
Champions of special tournaments are not considered GSL Champions.

Team League 

GOMeXp (then GOMTV) also used to run a team league named GOMTV Global StarCraft II Team League (GSTL). However, with the 2012 transition in Pro League events from Brood War to StarCraft II (starting with 2011-12 SK Planet Proleague Season 2), GOMeXp decided to stop running its team league at the end of 2013.

Other

Foreigner qualification house 
GOMTV used to run a house for select foreigners to live in while attempting to qualify for Code A. The house could accommodate up to 8 players. Players are responsible for travel to the GOM house, but all expenses other than food were covered by GOMTV. The house closed in November 2012.

GSL-MLG Exchange Program 
Major League Gaming and GOMTV announced a player exchange program between the tournaments. MLG will invite and provide travel for four Korean players every tournament and the players will be seeded directly into Championship pool. Starting from MLG Anaheim 2011 the winner of the tournament is given GSL Code S seed and top three non-Korean players (top four if the winner is Korean) are given Code A seeds.

MLG Columbus 2011 was the first event to see Korean invites. Moon "MMA" Sung Won won the tournament and the other invites finished 2nd, 3rd, and 8th. Non-Korean players accepting Code A seeds were Johan "NaNiWa" Lucchesi, Marcus "ThorZaIN" Eklöf, and Jian Carlo "Fenix" Morayra Alejo. They participated in both GSL August and GSTL August team leagues. For the team league, they formed a team, F.United, together with players from a Korean pro team, WeMadeFox.

It was thought that NaNiwa would have gotten the Code S spot for his second-place finish at the national finals at MLG Providence 2011, but it was revealed afterward that Code S would not have been given out at that event.

The GSL-MLG Exchange Program has since been nullified, as GSL is now partnered with IPL. MLG CEO Sundance DiGiovanni has hinted at the Naniwa Code S scandal as possible reasoning for the breakup of the partnership.

With the closure of IPL, the partner program between the two is now finished.  Since 2013, the GSL took over as the Korean part of the World Championship Series created by Blizzard Entertainment.

See also 
StarCraft II StarLeague
GOMTV Global StarCraft II Team League
StarCraft II in esports

References

External links 
 GOMEXP
 GSL's Broadcast on TwitchTV
 Picasa - GSL
 GSL Delicious Stack
 InviteParadise

StarCraft competitions
Esports competitions in South Korea
Recurring sporting events established in 2010